Gethin Wynne Jones (born 13 October 1995) is an Australian-born Welsh professional footballer who plays as a right back for League One club Bolton Wanderers.

Club career

Everton
Jones was born in Perth, Australia, and joined Everton's academy at the age of 12, signing from Wrexham's academy. His position switched from central midfield to right-back. While progressing through the ranks, Jones won Goal of the Season at the end of the 2011–12 season. He helped Everton win the Under-18 Premier League and in May 2014, then signed a one-year professional contract.

He made his professional debut for the club on 11 December 2014, replacing Tyias Browning in the final minute of a UEFA Europa League match against FC Krasnodar. Everton, having already advanced from the group, lost the match 0–1 at Goodison Park. With one appearance made in the 2014–15 season, Jones signed a two-year contract with the club, keeping him until 2017.

On 25 March 2015, Jones was loaned to League Two team Plymouth Argyle for the remainder of the season. He made his debut nine days later, playing the full 90 minutes in a 1–1 draw with league leaders Burton Albion at Home Park. He played a total of six league games as Plymouth reached the play-offs, featuring in the first leg of their eventual semi-final defeat to Wycombe Wanderers.

Jones joined Championship side Barnsley on 18 January 2017, until the end of the 2016–17 season. Jones made his Barnsley debut three days later, where he made his first start and played the whole game, in a 3–2 win over Leeds United. Jones made eighteen appearances that season: seventeen in the League for Barnsley and one EFL Trophy appearance for Everton U23s against Blackpool.

Jones featured only once more in Everton colours in 2017–18, again in the EFL Trophy, in a defeat to Notts County.

Fleetwood Town
Jones signed a "long-term" deal at EFL League One side Fleetwood Town on 5 January 2018, ending a decade-long association with Everton. He was assigned squad number 19. Jones made his Cod Army début as an 84th-minute substitute on 13 January, replacing Lewie Coyle in a 2–1 win over Southend United, before making his first Town start three days later in the FA Cup third round replay at Leicester City. His first league start for Fleetwood came on 20 January in a 2–1 defeat against fellow Lancashire club Blackburn Rovers.

He left Fleetwood Town by mutual consent on 19 August 2019.

Carlisle United
Jones signed a short-term deal at EFL League Two side Carlisle United on 13 September 2019. His contract was extended until the end of the season on 10 January 2020. Jones left Carlisle United following the 2019/20 season after he declined a contract extension with the club.

Bolton Wanderers
On 4 August 2020, Jones signed for Bolton Wanderers on a one year contract with the option of another year's extension. His debut came on 5 September in Bolton's first match of the season, a 1–2 home defeat against Bradford in the first round of the EFL Cup. On 5 December 2020 he scored the first goal of his professional career when he scored Bolton's first goal in a 3–6 defeat against Port Vale. On 8 May 2021, it was revealed Bolton had activated the extension in his contract. On 25 May, Jones revealed he had signed a new two-year contract and on 5 November, he signed a one-year contract extension extending it to 2024.

International career

Jones is eligible to play for Australia and Wales.

Jones was included in the Wales U16 side in the 2010 Victory Shield, playing against the English, Scottish, and Northern Irish equivalents. Having captained the side at U16 level, Jones also skippered Wales U17.

Jones was called up by Wales U19 for the first time, following his stint at U16 and U17. Jones made his Wales U19 debut on 10 September 2012, where he captained the side and played 90 minutes, in a 3–1 loss against Germany U19.

Two years later, Jones was called up by Wales U21 for the first time and made his Wales U21 debut on 5 September 2014, playing the whole game, in a 2–2 draw against Finland U21. Like his time at Wales U16, Wales U17 and Wales U19, Jones had captained Wales U21 as well.

Having trained with the full Welsh side, reports in November 2016 suggested Jones had been contacted by Football Federation Australia with a view to Jones representing Australia. In a 2017 interview, Jones confirmed that this had occurred and the offer was to play for the Australia U23 side.

In December 2020, he was asked in the Bolton Wanderers official match day programme whether he considered himself Welsh or Australian to which he replied:

"I'd have to say Wales, obviously I was born in Australia but I've lived in Wales pretty much my whole life and speak the Welsh language. I'm 100% Welsh."

Personal life
In 2021, Jones's mother was diagnosed with motor neurone disease. On 23 September, Bolton Wanderers (Jones' team at the time) announced the first team would play a friendly against a team consisting of legendary Bolton players on 13 November to help raise money for his mother's recovery. A quarter of the money raised would also go to former Bolton player Stephen Darby's charity Darby Rimmer MND Foundation, as he had also suffered from Motor Neurone Disease which had forced him to retire. His mother died on 2 March 2022.

Career statistics

Notes

Honours
Bolton Wanderers
EFL League Two third-place (promotion): 2020–21

References

External links

Living people
1995 births
Sportsmen from Western Australia
Australian people of Welsh descent
Welsh footballers
Association football defenders
Wrexham A.F.C. players
Everton F.C. players
Plymouth Argyle F.C. players
Barnsley F.C. players
Fleetwood Town F.C. players
Carlisle United F.C. players
Bolton Wanderers F.C. players
Wales youth international footballers
Wales under-21 international footballers
Soccer players from Perth, Western Australia
English Football League players